A flame may exhibit intrinsic instabilities of several kinds when one or more of the physico-chemical balances associated with its propagation is offset. In premixed flames, the primary instability is a hydrodynamic instability — known as the Darrieus-Landau instability — which results from thermal expansion across the flame interface. In non-premixed (diffusion) flames, thermo-diffusive instabilities are predominant while the hydrodynamic instability plays a secondary role.

References

Combustion